Jim Murphy Jr. is a former American football player and coach. He served as the head football coach at Merrimack College in North Andover, Massachusetts from 2003 to 2007.

Murphy played college football as a quarterback at Northeastern University in Boston. He played for one season for the Barcelona Dragons of NFL Europe. He spent part of two seasons on the New England Patriots roster.

References

Year of birth missing (living people)
Living people
American football quarterbacks
Barcelona Dragons players
Merrimack Warriors football coaches
New England Patriots players
Northeastern Huskies football players